The Dorsland tree, also known as the Dorsland Baobab and the Dorsland Grootboom, is a baobab tree in Namibia which is found to the south of the Khaudum National Park. At around 2,100 years old, it is believed to be the oldest tree in the country. In 2006, two of its oldest relatives died.

The tree was where the Dorsland trekkers camped in 1883 and they carved the year of the visit, "1883", into the tree. In 1891 a detachment of German troops passed the tree and carved "1891" and the name of three in the group "H. Gathemann", "E. Heller" and "D. Hannemann" into the tree.

References 

Individual baobab trees